The total number of languages natively spoken in Africa is variously estimated (depending on the delineation of language vs. dialect) at between 1,250 and 2,100, and by some counts at over 3,000.
Nigeria alone has over 500 languages (according to SIL Ethnologue), one of the greatest concentrations of linguistic diversity in the world. The Languages of Africa belong to many distinct language families, among which the largest are:
Niger–Congo, which include the large Atlantic-Congo and Bantu branches in West, Central, Southeast and Southern Africa.
Afroasiatic languages are spread throughout Western Asia, North Africa, the Horn of Africa and parts of the Sahel.
Saharan, Nilotic and Sudanic languages (previously grouped under the hypothetical Nilo-Saharan macro-family), are present in East Africa and Sahel.
Austronesian languages are spoken in Madagascar and parts of the Comoros.
Khoe–Kwadi languages are spoken principally in Namibia and Botswana.
Indo-European languages are spoken in South Africa and Namibia (Afrikaans, English, German) and are used as lingua francas in the former colonies of the United Kingdom and Liberia that was part of American Colonization Society (English), former colonies of France and of Belgium (French), former colonies of Portugal (Portuguese), former colonies of Italy (Italian), former colonies of Spain (Spanish) and the current Spanish territories of Ceuta, Melilla and the Canary Islands and the current French territories of Mayotte and La Réunion.

There are several other small families and language isolates, as well as creoles and languages that have yet to be classified. In addition, Africa has a wide variety of sign languages, many of which are language isolates.

Around a hundred languages are widely used for interethnic communication. These include Arabic, Somali, Amharic, Oromo, Igbo, Swahili, Hausa, Manding, Fulani and Yoruba, which are spoken as a second (or non-first) language by millions of people. Although many African languages are used on the radio, in newspapers and in primary-school education, and some of the larger ones are considered national languages, only a few are official at the national level. In Sub-Saharan Africa, most official languages at the national level tend to be colonial languages such as French, Portuguese, or English. 

The African Union declared 2006 the "Year of African Languages".

Language groups

Most languages natively spoken in Africa belong to one of the two large language families that dominate the continent: Afroasiatic, or Niger–Congo. Another hundred belong to smaller families such as Ubangian, Nilotic, Saharan, and the various families previously grouped under the umbrella term Khoisan. In addition, the languages of Africa include several unclassified languages and sign languages.

The earliest Afroasiatic languages are associated with the Capsian culture, the Saharan languages are linked with the Khartoum Mesolithic/Neolithic cultures. Niger-Congo languages are correlated with the west and central African hoe-based farming traditions and the Khoisan languages are matched with the south and southeastern Wilton industries.

Afroasiatic languages

Afroasiatic languages are spoken throughout North Africa, the Horn of Africa, Western Asia and parts of the Sahel. There are approximately 375 Afroasiatic languages spoken by over 400 million people. The main subfamilies of Afroasiatic are Berber, Chadic, Cushitic, Omotic, Egyptian and Semitic. The Afroasiatic Urheimat is uncertain. The family's most extensive branch, the Semitic languages (including Arabic, Amharic and Hebrew among others), is the only branch of Afroasiatic that is spoken outside Africa.

Some of the most widely spoken Afroasiatic languages include Arabic (a Semitic language, and a recent arrival from West Asia), Somali (Cushitic), Berber (Berber), Hausa (Chadic), Amharic (Semitic) and Oromo (Cushitic). Of the world's surviving language families, Afroasiatic has the longest written history, as both the Akkadian language of Mesopotamia and Ancient Egyptian are members.

Nilo-Saharan languages

Nilo-Saharan languages are a proposed grouping of some one hundred diverse languages. Genealogical linkage between these languages has failed to be conclusively demonstrated, and support for the proposal is sparse among linguists. The languages share some unusual morphology, but if they are related, most of the branches must have undergone major restructuring since diverging from their common ancestor. 

This hypothetical family would reach an expennse that stretches from the Nile Valley to northern Tanzania and into Nigeria and DR Congo, with the Songhay languages along the middle reaches of the Niger River as a geographic outlier. The inclusion of the Songhay languages is questionable, and doubts have been raised over the Koman, Gumuz and Kadu branches.

Some of the better known Nilo-Saharan languages are Kanuri, Fur, Songhay, Nobiin and the widespread Nilotic family, which includes the Luo, Dinka and Maasai. Most Nilo-Saharan languages are tonal, as are Niger-Congo languages.

Niger–Congo languages

The Niger–Congo languages constitute the largest language family spoken in West Africa and perhaps the world in terms of the number of languages. One of its salient features is an elaborate noun class system with grammatical concord. A large majority of languages of this family are tonal such as Yoruba and Igbo, Akan and Ewe language. A major branch of Niger–Congo languages is the Bantu phylum, which has a wider speech area than the rest of the family (see Niger–Congo B (Bantu) in the map above).

The Niger–Kordofanian language family, joining Niger–Congo with the Kordofanian languages of south-central Sudan, was proposed in the 1950s by Joseph Greenberg. Today, linguists often use "Niger–Congo" to refer to this entire family, including Kordofanian as a subfamily. One reason for this is that it is not clear whether Kordofanian was the first branch to diverge from rest of Niger–Congo. Mande has been claimed to be equally or more divergent. Niger–Congo is generally accepted by linguists, though a few question the inclusion of Mande and Dogon, and there is no conclusive evidence for the inclusion of Ubangian.

Other language families
Several languages spoken in Africa belong to language families concentrated or originating outside the African continent.

Austronesian
Malagasy belongs to the Austronesian languages and is the westernmost branch of the family. It is the national and co-official language of Madagascar and one of Malagasy dialects called Bushi is also spoken in Mayotte.
 	
The ancestors of the Malagasy people migrated to Madagascar around 1,500 years ago from Southeast Asia, more specifically the island of Borneo. The origins of how they arrived to Madagascar remains a mystery, however the Austronesians are known for their seafaring culture. Despite the geographical isolation, Malagasy still has strong resemblance to Barito languages especially the Ma'anyan language of southern Borneo. 

With more than 20 million speakers, Malagasy is one of the most widely spoken of the Austronesian languages.

Indo-European
Afrikaans is Indo-European, as is most of the vocabulary of most African creole languages. Afrikaans evolved from the Dutch vernacular of South Holland (Hollandic dialect) spoken by the mainly Dutch settlers of what is now South Africa, where it gradually began to develop distinguishing characteristics in the course of the 18th century, including the loss of verbal conjugation (save for 5 modal verbs), as well as grammatical case and gender. Most Afrikaans speakers live in South Africa. In Namibia it is the lingua franca. Overall 15 to 20 million people are estimated to speak Afrikaans.

Since the colonial era, Indo-European languages such as Afrikaans, English, French, Italian, Portuguese and Spanish have held official status in many countries, and are widely spoken, generally as lingua francas. (See African French and African Portuguese.) German was once used in Germany's colonies there from the late 1800s until World War I, when Britain and France took over and revoked German's official status. Despite this, German is still spoken in Namibia, mostly among the white population. Although it lost its official status in the 1990s, it has been redesignated as a national language. Indian languages such as Gujarati are spoken by South Asian expatriates exclusively. In earlier historical times, other Indo-European languages could be found in various parts of the continent, such as Old Persian and Greek in Egypt, Latin and Vandalic in North Africa and Modern Persian in the Horn of Africa.

Small families
The three small Khoisan families of southern Africa have not been shown to be closely related to any other major language family. In addition, there are various other families that have not been demonstrated to belong to one of these families. The classifications below follow Glottolog.
Mande, some 70 languages, including the major languages of Mali and Guinea. These are generally thought to be divergent Niger–Congo, but debate persists.
Ubangian, some 70 languages, centered on the languages of the Central African Republic; may be Niger–Congo
Te-Ne-Omotic, some 20 languages, previously classified under Adro-Asiatiac, spoken in Ethiopia
Khoe-Kwadi, around 10 languages, the primary family of Khoisan languages of Namibia and Botswana
Surmic, some 11 languages, previously classified within either Sudanic or Nilo-Saharan.
Kx’a, around five languages, with various dialects, spoken in Southern Africa
South Omotic, around five languages; previously classified within Afro-Asiatic, spoken in Ethiopia
Tuu, or Taa-ǃKwi, two surviving languages
Hadza, an isolate of Tanzania
Bangime, a likely isolate of Mali
Jalaa, a likely isolate of Nigeria
Sandawe, an isolate of Tanzania
Laal, a possible isolate of Chad

Khoisan is a term of convenience covering some 30 languages spoken by around 300,000–400,000 people. There are five Khoisan families that have not been shown to be related to each other: Khoe, Tuu and Kx’a, which are found mainly in Namibia and Botswana, as well as Sandawe and Hadza of Tanzania, which are language isolates. A striking feature of Khoisan languages, and the reason they are often grouped together, is their use of click consonants. Some neighbouring Bantu languages (notably Xhosa and Zulu) have clicks as well, but these were adopted from Khoisan languages. The Khoisan languages are also tonal.

Creole languages
Due partly to its multilingualism and its colonial past, a substantial proportion of the world's creole languages are to be found in Africa. Some are based on Indo-European languages (e.g. Krio from English in Sierra Leone and the very similar Pidgin in Nigeria, Ghana and parts of Cameroon; Cape Verdean Creole in Cape Verde and Guinea-Bissau Creole in Guinea-Bissau and Senegal, all from Portuguese; Seychellois Creole in the Seychelles and Mauritian Creole in Mauritius, both from French); some are based on Arabic (e.g. Juba Arabic in the southern Sudan, or Nubi in parts of Uganda and Kenya); some are based on local languages (e.g. Sango, the main language of the Central African Republic); while in Cameroon a creole based on French, English and local African languages known as Camfranglais has started to become popular.

Unclassified languages

A fair number of unclassified languages are reported in Africa. Many remain unclassified simply for lack of data; among the better-investigated ones that continue to resist easy classification are:

 possibly Afroasiatic: Ongota, Gomba
 possibly Nilo-Saharan: Shabo
 possibly Niger–Congo: Jalaa, Mbre, Bayot
 unknown: Laal, Mpre
Of these, Jalaa is perhaps the most likely to be an isolate.

Less-well investigated languages include Irimba, Luo, Mawa, Rer Bare (possibly Bantu), Bete (evidently Jukunoid), Bung (unclear), Kujarge (evidently Chadic), Lufu (Jukunoid), Meroitic (possibly Afroasiatic), Oropom (possibly spurious) and Weyto (evidently Cushitic). Several of these are extinct, and adequate comparative data is thus unlikely to be forthcoming. Hombert & Philippson (2009) list a number of African languages that have been classified as language isolates at one point or another. Many of these are simply unclassified, but Hombert & Philippson believe Africa has about twenty language families, including isolates. Beside the possibilities listed above, there are:

Aasax or Aramanik (Tanzania) (South Cushitic? contains non-Cushitic lexicon)
Imeraguen (Mauritania) - Hassaniyya Arabic restructured on an Azêr (Soninke) base
Kara (Fer?) (Central African Republic)
Oblo (Cameroon) (Adamawa? Extinct?)

Roger Blench notes a couple additional possibilities:
Defaka (Nigeria)
Dompo (Ghana)

Below is a list of language isolates and otherwise unclassified languages in Africa, from Vossen & Dimmendaal (2020:434):

Sign languages

Many African countries have national sign languages, such as Algerian Sign Language, Tunisian Sign Language, Ethiopian Sign Language. Other sign languages are restricted to small areas or single villages, such as Adamorobe Sign Language in Ghana. Tanzania has seven, one for each of its schools for the Deaf, all of which are discouraged. Not much is known, since little has been published on these languages

Sign language systems extant in Africa include the Paget Gorman Sign System used in Namibia and Angola, the Sudanese Sign languages used in Sudan and South Sudan, the Arab Sign languages used across the Arab Mideast, the Francosign languages used in Francophone Africa and other areas such as Ghana and Tunisia, and the Tanzanian Sign languages used in Tanzania.

Language in Africa
Throughout the long multilingual history of the African continent, African languages have been subject to phenomena like language contact, language expansion, language shift and language death. A case in point is the Bantu expansion, in which Bantu-speaking peoples expanded over most of Sub-Equatorial Africa, intermingling with Khoi-San speaking peoples from much of Southeast Africa and Southern Africa and other peoples from Central Africa. Another example is the Arab expansion in the 7th century, which led to the extension of Arabic from its homeland in Asia, into much of North Africa and the Horn of Africa.

Trade languages are another age-old phenomenon in the African linguistic landscape. Cultural and linguistic innovations spread along trade routes and languages of peoples dominant in trade developed into languages of wider communication (lingua franca). Of particular importance in this respect are Berber (North and West Africa), Jula (western West Africa), Fulfulde (West Africa), Hausa (West Africa), Lingala (Congo), Swahili (Southeast Africa), Somali (Horn of Africa) and Arabic (North Africa and Horn of Africa).

After gaining independence, many African countries, in the search for national unity, selected one language, generally the former colonial language, to be used in government and education. However, in recent years, African countries have become increasingly supportive of maintaining linguistic diversity. Language policies that are being developed nowadays are mostly aimed at multilingualism.

Official languages

Besides the former colonial languages of English, French, Portuguese, Dutch (Afrikaans) and Spanish, the following languages are official at the national level in Africa (non-exhaustive list):
Afroasiatic
Arabic in Algeria, Chad, Comoros, Djibouti, Egypt, Libya, Mauritania, Morocco, Somalia, Sudan, Tunisia and Zanzibar (Tanzania)
Berber in Morocco and Algeria
Amharic, Oromo, Afar, Tigrigna, and Somali in Ethiopia
Somali in Somalia, Ethiopia, Kenya, and Djibouti 
Tigrinya in Ethiopia and Eritrea

Austronesian
Malagasy in Madagascar

French Creole
Sango in the Central African Republic
Seychelles Creole in Seychelles

Indo-European
Afrikaans in South Africa

Niger-Congo
Chewa in Malawi and Zimbabwe
Comorian in the Comoros
Kongo in Angola, Democratic Republic of the Congo, Gabon, and Republic of the Congo
Kinyarwanda in Rwanda
Kirundi in Burundi
Sesotho in Lesotho, South Africa and Zimbabwe
Setswana in Botswana and South Africa
Shona, Sindebele in Zimbabwe
Sepedi in South Africa
Ndebele in South Africa
Swahili in Tanzania, Kenya, Rwanda and Uganda
Swati in Eswatini (Swaziland) and South Africa
Tsonga in South Africa
Venda in South Africa
Xhosa in South Africa
Zulu in South Africa

Cross-border languages
The colonial borders established by European powers following the Berlin Conference in 1884–1885 divided a great many ethnic groups and African language speaking communities. This can cause divergence of a language on either side of a border (especially when the official languages are different), for example, in orthographic standards. Some notable cross-border languages include Berber (which stretches across much of North Africa and some parts of West Africa), Kikongo (that stretches across northern Angola, western and coastal Democratic Republic of the Congo, and western and coastal Republic of the Congo), Somali (stretches across most of the Horn of Africa), Swahili (spoken in the African Great Lakes region), Fula (in the Sahel and West Africa) and Luo (in Democratic Republic of the Congo, Ethiopia, Kenya, Tanzania, Uganda, South Sudan and Sudan).

Some prominent Africans such as former Malian president and former Chairman of the African Commission, Alpha Oumar Konaré, have referred to cross-border languages as a factor that can promote African unity.

Language change and planning
Language is not static in Africa any more than on other continents. In addition to the (likely modest) impact of borders, there are also cases of dialect levelling (such as in Igbo and probably many others), koinés (such as N'Ko and possibly Runyakitara) and emergence of new dialects (such as Sheng). In some countries, there are official efforts to develop standardized language versions.

There are also many less widely spoken languages that may be considered endangered languages.

Demographics

Of the 1 billion Africans (in 2009), about 17 percent speak an Arabic dialect. About 10 percent speak Swahili, the lingua franca of Southeast Africa; about 5 percent speak a Berber dialect; and about 5 percent speak Hausa, which serves as a lingua franca in much of the Sahel. Other important West African languages are Yoruba, Igbo, Akan and Fula. Major Horn of Africa languages are Somali, Amharic and Oromo. Important South African languages are Sotho, Tswana, Pedi, Venda, Tsonga, Swazi, Southern Ndebele, Zulu, Xhosa and Afrikaans.

English, French and Portuguese are important languages in Africa. About 130 million, 115 million and 35 million Africans, respectively, speak them as either native or secondary languages. Portuguese has become the national language of Angola and São Tomé and Príncipe, and Portuguese is the official language of Mozambique. The economies of Angola and Mozambique are quickly becoming economic powerhouses in Africa. Through (among other factors) sheer demographic weight, Africans are increasingly taking ownership of these three world languages as they are having an ever-greater influence on the research, economic growth and development in the African countries where English, French and Portuguese are spoken.

Linguistic features
Some linguistic features are particularly common among languages spoken in Africa, whereas others are less common. Such shared traits probably are not due to a common origin of all African languages. Instead, some may be due to language contact (resulting in borrowing) and specific idioms and phrases may be due to a similar cultural background.

Phonological
Some widespread phonetic features include:
 certain types of consonants, such as implosives, ejectives, the labiodental flap and in southern Africa, clicks. True implosives are rare outside Africa, and clicks and the flap almost unheard of.
 nasal stops which only occur with nasal vowels, such as  vs.  (but both  and ), especially in West Africa.
 vowels contrasting an advanced or retracted tongue, commonly called "tense" and "lax".
 simple tone systems which are used for grammatical purposes.

Sounds that are relatively uncommon in African languages include uvular consonants, diphthongs and front rounded vowels

Tonal languages are found throughout the world but are predominantly used in Africa. Both the Nilo-Saharan and the Khoi-San phyla are fully tonal. The large majority of the Niger–Congo languages are also tonal. Tonal languages are also found in the Omotic, Chadic and South & East Cushitic branches of Afroasiatic. The most common type of tonal system opposes two tone levels, High (H) and Low (L). Contour tones do occur, and can often be analysed as two or more tones in succession on a single syllable. Tone melodies play an important role, meaning that it is often possible to state significant generalizations by separating tone sequences ("melodies") from the segments that bear them. Tonal sandhi processes like tone spread, tone shift, downstep and downdrift are common in African languages.

Syntactic
Widespread syntactical structures include the common use of adjectival verbs and the expression of comparison by means of a verb 'to surpass'. The Niger–Congo languages have large numbers of genders (noun classes) which cause agreement in verbs and other words. Case, tense and other categories may be distinguished only by tone. Auxiliary verbs are also widespread among African languages; the fusing of subject markers and TAM/polarity auxiliaries into what are known as tense pronouns are more common in auxiliary verb constructions in African languages than in most other parts of the world.

Semantic
Quite often, only one term is used for both animal and meat; the word nama or nyama for animal/meat is particularly widespread in otherwise widely divergent African languages.

Demographics
The following is a table displaying the number of speakers of given languages within Africa:

By region

Below is a list of the major languages of Africa by region, family and total number of primary language speakers in millions.

See also

General
 Languages of the African Union
 Writing systems of Africa
 Journal of West African Languages
 List of extinct languages of Africa

Works
 Polyglotta Africana
 The Languages of Africa

Classifiers
 Karl Lepsius
 Lionel Bender
 Wilhelm Bleek
 Christopher Ehret
 Carl Meinhof
 Diedrich Westermann
 Joseph Greenberg

Colonial and migratory influences
 
 Arabization
 Asian Africans
 Dutch Language Union
 French West Africa
 German colonization of Africa
 Islamization of Egypt
 Italian East Africa — including Italian Ethiopia
 Italian North Africa
 North African Arabs
 Maghrebi Arabic — via Muslim conquest of the Maghreb
 Portuguese language in Africa — predominant in Portuguese-speaking African countries
 Spanish Guinea — presently Equatorial Guinea
 Spanish West Africa
 Spanish North Africa
 West African Pidgin English
 White Africans of European ancestry

Notes

References
 Childs, G. Tucker (2003). An Introduction to African Languages. Amsterdam: John Benjamin.
 Chimhundu, Herbert (2002). Language Policies in Africa. (Final report of the Intergovernmental Conference on Language Policies in Africa.) Revised version. UNESCO.
 Cust, Robert Needham (1883). Modern Languages of Africa.
 Ellis, Stephen (ed.) (1996). Africa Now: People - Policies - Institutions. The Hague: Ministry of Foreign Affairs (DGIS).
 Elugbe, Ben (1998) "Cross-border and major languages of Africa." In K. Legère (editor), Cross-border Languages: Reports and Studies, Regional Workshop on Cross-Border Languages, National Institute for Educational Development (NIED), Okahandja, 23–27 September 1996. Windhoek: Gamsberg Macmillan.
 Ethnologue.com's Africa: A listing of African languages and language families.
 Greenberg, Joseph H. (1983). 'Some areal characteristics of African languages.' In Ivan R. Dihoff (editor), Current Approaches to African Linguistics, Vol. 1 (Publications in African Languages and Linguistics, Vol. 1), Dordrecht: Foris, 3-21.
 Greenberg, Joseph H. (1966). The Languages of Africa (2nd edition with additions and corrections). Bloomington: Indiana University.
 Heine, Bernd and Derek Nurse (editors) (2000). African Languages: An Introduction. Cambridge: Cambridge University Press.
 Webb, Vic and Kembo-Sure (editors) (1998). African Voices: An Introduction to the Languages and Linguistics of Africa. Cape Town: Oxford University Press Southern Africa.
 Westphal, E.O.J. (1963). The Linguistic Prehistory of Southern Africa: Bush, Kwadi, Hottentot, and Bantu Linguistic Relationships. Africa, 33(3), 237–265.

External links
one of the largest online resources for African languages at Mofeko
African language resources for children 
Web resources for African languages
Linguistic maps of Africa from Muturzikin.com
Online Dictionaries, e-books and other online fulltexts in or on African languages